Istvan Kulcsar (born 13 September 1936) is a Swiss fencer. He competed in the individual and team sabre events at the 1972 Summer Olympics.

References

External links
 

1936 births
Living people
Swiss male sabre fencers
Olympic fencers of Switzerland
Fencers at the 1972 Summer Olympics
Swiss people of Hungarian descent